Pittsburg is a ghost town in Seward County, Nebraska, United States.

History
Pittsburg was founded in 1873 at a location once thought to be rich in valuable peat, but the town was soon abandoned. The founder might have intended the name to be Peatsburg. A post office spelled Pittsburgh operated between 1873 and 1875.

References

Geography of Seward County, Nebraska